Theodore A. Swinarski (November 25, 1905 – July 21, 1992) was an American politician and businessman.

Born in Chicago, Illinois, Swinarski was educated in the Chicago public and parochial schools. Swinarski was an Illinois state police officer. He served as clerk for the Cook County Circuit Court and owned a trucking firm.: D&D Trucking Firm. He served in the Illinois House of Representatives and the Illinois Senate. He was a Democrat. Swinarski died at his home in Fort Lauderdale, Florida. His son Donald T. Swinarski also served in the Illinois General Assembly.

Notes

1905 births
1992 deaths
Politicians from Chicago
Politicians from Fort Lauderdale, Florida
Businesspeople from Chicago
Democratic Party members of the Illinois House of Representatives
Democratic Party Illinois state senators
20th-century American politicians
20th-century American businesspeople